Riverhead is a census-designated place (CDP) roughly corresponding to the hamlet by the same name located in the town of Riverhead in Suffolk County, New York on Long Island. The CDP's population was 13,299 at the 2010 census.

Situated at the mouth of the Peconic River, which empties into Peconic Bay where the North and South Forks of Long Island split, the town of Riverhead—of which the CDP is a part—is the official county seat of Suffolk County.  In the 1960s, most of the county offices moved to the CDP of Hauppauge in the towns of Islip and Smithtown in the more populous western half of the county—a move which still spurs attempts for the town of Riverhead to lead the way for the secession of eastern Long Island towns to form Peconic County.

History

The hamlet began with the Suffolk County Court House, a 1727 structure built to serve both the North and South fork. Since that year, Riverhead has served as the seat of Suffolk County, and still contains the primary courts of the region.

Riverhead's downtown area formed as an active commercial hub during the 19th century. In the beginning of the 20th century, the community saw an influx of Polish immigrants, as did the rest of the town. This led to the creation of Polish Town, where the popular Polish Town Fair is held annually. The downtown experienced urban blight during the mid-20th century, but recovered as of the beginning of the 21st century.

Geography

The hamlet contains the principal downtown area in the Town of Riverhead and one of the largest in Suffolk County. Outside of this downtown area are rural sections which contain both active farms and residential developments.

Demographics 

As of the census of 2010, there were 13,299 people. The racial make up of the CDP was 74.6% White, (55.9% Not Hispanic or Latino), 18.5% African American/Black, 23.5% Hispanic or Latino (of any race), 1.4% Asian American, and 1.2% Two or More Races.

As of the census of 2000, there were 10,513 people, 3,878 households, and 2,547 families residing in the CDP. The population density was 696.5 per square mile (269.0/km2). There were 4,167 housing units at an average density of 276.1/sq mi (106.6/km2). The racial makeup of the CDP was 89.98% white, 02.82% black or African American, 0.55% Native American, 1.13% Asian, 0.08% Pacific Islander, 2.15% from other races, and 2.29% from two or more races. Hispanic or Latino of any race were 2.03% of the population.

There were 3,878 households, out of which 29.4% had children under the age of 18 living with them, 44.0% were married couples living together, 16.8% had a female householder with no husband present, and 34.3% were non-families. 27.5% of all households were made up of individuals, and 15.4% had someone living alone who was 65 years of age or older. The average household size was 2.57 and the average family size was 3.09.

In the CDP, the population was spread out, with 24.1% under the age of 18, 7.6% from 18 to 24, 27.9% from 25 to 44, 21.1% from 45 to 64, and 19.3% who were 65 years of age or older. The median age was 39 years. For every 100 females, there were 90.9 males. For every 100 females age 18 and over, there were 87.2 males.

The median income for a household in the CDP was $35,330, and the median income for a family was $39,672. Males had a median income of $35,707 versus $28,021 for females. The per capita income for the CDP was $17,746. About 9.2% of families and 13.0% of the population were below the poverty line, including 16.7% of those under age 18 and 9.2% of those age 65 or over.

Media
The Riverhead newspaper Riverhead News-Review, dates back to 1950, when the Harry Lee Publishing Co. Inc, publishers of  The County Review (1903–1950), purchased The Riverhead News (1868–1950) and consolidated the two newspapers as The News-Review.  Times/Review Newspapers Corp. purchased The News-Review  and  The Suffolk Times, based in Greenport, in 1977.

The news website RiverheadLOCAL began publication in 2010. It is owned by East End Local Media Corp., an independent company based in Riverhead.

Radio stations WFTU, WRCN-FM, WRIV and W215BT are licensed to Riverhead. Independent television station WLNY-TV (channel 55) is also licensed to Riverhead and owned by CBS News and Stations, with most operations being run from the CBS Broadcast Center in Manhattan with WCBS-TV.

Schools

•Riverhead Central School District

•Suffolk County Community College Eastern campus

Transportation

The Long Island Rail Road's Main Line (or Greenport Branch) provides limited service between Riverhead station and Ronkonkoma station (to the west), and Riverhead station and Greenport station (to the east). At Ronkonkoma, passengers can connect to New York City-bound electric trains. It is also served by Hampton Jitney's North Fork route. In addition, it is also served by the following Suffolk County Transit routes:
 8A: Calverton - Suffolk County Community College East Campus
 S58: Riverhead - Smith Haven Mall via Middle Country Road
 S62: Riverhead - Hauppauge via New York State Route 25A
 S66: Riverhead - Patchogue via Mastic Beach
 S92: Orient Point - East Hampton

References

External links

Riverhead (town), New York
Census-designated places in New York (state)
Hamlets in New York (state)
Census-designated places in Suffolk County, New York
Hamlets in Suffolk County, New York
Polish-American culture in New York (state)
Populated coastal places in New York (state)

pt:Riverhead
vo:Riverhead